Gibraltar Barracks is a military installation located on Out Risbygate, Bury St Edmunds.

History
The barracks were opened in 1878. Their creation took place as part of the Cardwell Reforms which encouraged the localisation of British military forces. The barracks became the depot for the two battalions of the 12th (East Suffolk) Regiment of Foot. Following the Childers Reforms, the regiment evolved to become the Suffolk Regiment with its depot in the barracks in 1881. The barracks went on to become the regional centre for infantry training as the East Anglian Brigade Depot in 1960 and remained the regimental headquarters of the Royal Anglian Regiment, until it moved to Blenheim Camp on Newmarket Road in Bury St Edmunds in the 2010s.

Suffolk Regiment Museum
The Suffolk Regiment Museum was established in the officers' mess in 1935 before moving to the keep in the late 1960s. It includes uniforms, weapons, regimental trophies, badges, insignia, musical items and other memorabilia.

References

Installations of the British Army
Barracks in England
Museums in Suffolk
Regimental museums in England
Suffolk Regiment